The Treason Act 1945 (8 & 9 Geo.6 c.44) was an Act of the Parliament of the United Kingdom.

It was introduced into the House of Lords as a purely procedural statute, whose sole purpose was to abolish the old and highly technical procedure in cases of treason, and assimilate it to the procedure on trials for murder:

It also abolished the rule that treason trials in Scotland had to be conducted according to the rules of English criminal law.

Provisions

Section 1 
Section 1 of the Act applied the Treason Act 1800 to all cases of treason and misprision of treason, subject to five separate repeals of words, and to a saving clause in section 2(2):

Section 2 
Section 2(1) of the Act effected consequential repeals.

The application of the Treason Act 1800 was subject to a saving clause in section 2(2).

Section 3 
Section 3(1) of the Act provided that it may be cited as the Treason Act, 1945.

Section 3(2) of the Act extended the Treason Act 1800, as applied by the Act, to Northern Ireland.

Section 3(3) of the Act provided that, for the purposes of section 6 of the Government of Ireland Act 1920, the Act was to be deemed to be an Act passed before the appointed day.

Use of the Act 
The procedure established by this Act was used in four trials: those of William Joyce, John Amery, Thomas Haller Cooper and Walter Purdy. J. W. Hall said that if the statutory requirement for corroboration had not been repealed by this Act, William Joyce could not have been convicted on the basis of the evidence offered at his trial. One witness, Detective Inspector Hunt, connected him with the broadcasts during the period before the expiration of the passport (though other witnesses might have come forward).

Repeal and replacement 
The schedule to this Act was repealed on 18 December 1953 by section 1 of, and the first schedule to, the Statute Law Revision Act 1953, except in so far as it related to the Treason Act 1695 and the Treason Act 1708. Those two entries could not be repealed because they were referred to in section 2(2). The other entries were spent because their sole effect was to repeal other enactments.

Sections 1 and 2 of, and the Schedule to, this Act were repealed for England and Wales by section 10(2) of, and Part III of Schedule 3 to, the Criminal Law Act 1967.

The Act was repealed for Northern Ireland by section 15(2) of, and Part 2 of Schedule 2 to, Criminal Law Act (Northern Ireland) 1967, and for Scotland by section 83(3) of, and Schedule 8 to, the Criminal Justice (Scotland) Act 1980.

Section 3(3) of the Act was repealed for Northern Ireland by section 41(1) of, and Part I of Schedule 6 to, the Northern Ireland Constitution Act 1973 (c.36).

Section 1 of this Act, and the Treason Act 1800, have been replaced for England and Wales by section 12(6) of the Criminal Law Act 1967 and for Northern Ireland by section 14(7) of the Criminal Law Act (Northern Ireland) 1967. They were replaced for Scotland by section 39 of the Criminal Justice (Scotland) Act 1980 (also repealed).

See also 
High treason in the United Kingdom
Treason Act

References 
Hansard (House of Lords), 17 May 1945, vol. 136 col. 227 (first reading)
Hansard (House of Lords), 30 May 1945, vol. 136, col. 265 - 276 (second reading)
Hansard (House of Commons), 31 May 1945, vol. 411, col. 380 - 381 (first reading)
Hansard (House of Commons), 11 June 1945, vol. 411, col. 1393 - 1398 (second reading)
Hansard (House of Commons), 12 June 1945, vol. 411, col. 1605 - 1606 (committee and third reading)
Hansard (House of Lords), 13 June 1945, vol. 136, col.567
Hansard (House of Commons), 15 June 1945, vol. 411, col. 1887 - 1904 (royal assent)

United Kingdom Acts of Parliament 1945
Treason in the United Kingdom